Gerard Jacob Kleywegt (born 5 June 1962, in Rozenburg) is a Dutch X-ray crystallographer and the former team leader of the Protein Data Bank in Europe at the EBI; a member of the Worldwide Protein Data Bank.

Education
Kleywegt obtained his PhD from the University of Utrecht in 1991.

Career
After his PhD, Kleywegt did postdoctoral research with Alwyn Jones at Uppsala University. before moving to the EBI.

Research
Kleywegt's research focuses on protein crystallography and the Protein Data Bank.

References

1962 births
Living people
Dutch biochemists
Crystallographers
Leiden University alumni
Utrecht University alumni
People from Rozenburg